Hajji Hazer (also Romanized as Ḩājjī Ḩāẕer; also known as Ḩājī Āzar, Ḩājjī Āzar, Mazār-e Ḩājjī Bābā Ḩāzer, Mazār-e Ḩajjī Hazār, Mazār Hāji Hazār, and Mazār Ḩājjī Hazār) is a village in Kalan Rural District, Zarneh District, Eyvan County, Ilam Province, Iran. At the 2006 census, its population was 49, in 11 families. The village is populated by Kurds.

References 

Populated places in Eyvan County
Kurdish settlements in Ilam Province